This novel is being touted as India’s first three-dimensional graphic novel with a realistic visual interpretation of about 150 scenes.
Atharva – The Origin is a graphic novel authored by Ramesh Thamilmani features over 150 lifelike illustrations which present the gripping, racy narrative. It is produced by M.V.M. Vel mohan, Vincent Adaikalaraj and Ashok Manor. Reportedly, the makers are also planning to make a web-series based on the novel.

Publication history
Former Indian cricket captain MS Dhoni as a mythological superhero on the cover of the novel. Quiz the writer about what made him rope the sportsperson and he says, “Since the scale is big, we wanted a big name to take it to the next level. And MSD was the right person. We always wanted him but getting him on-board felt like a distant dream.”

He adds, “Being a real-life hero, he is the perfect fit for the character of a superhero in the novel. He didn’t only give us his face but also collaborated with us in a big way. He contributed to an extent which we never expected.”

Talking about what sets it apart from regular comic books, Thamilmani says, “We’ve created 3D models of characters. We hired stunts men to show us action sequences and draw them. It was a time-consuming process and was more like a pre-production for a film."

Relaunch as comic
The graphic novel, written by author Ramesh Thamilmani, has been recreated by Pratilipi Comics with "new character designs, artwork, and creative elements, revolutionising the Indian online comic space.In September 2022 the novel was relaunched as comic in Pratilipi comics.

External links
  Atharva - The Origin motion poster

References

2022 graphic novels